Humber Fifteen 15 horsepower cars were medium to large cars, classified as medium weight, with a less powerful than usual engine which attracted less annual taxation and provided more stately progress. The coachwork was superbly finished, specially the tourers, and these cars were much favoured by the professional classes.

They were manufactured from 1919 to 1924 and 1924 to 1927. Their former place in Humber's catalogue was bracketed in 1927 and 1928 by new cars, a much smaller engined 14/40 or late in the same year a 20-horsepower six-cylinder 20/55 of ten per cent greater capacity.

Introduction
These cars were displayed at Olympia's first postwar Motor Show in November 1919. Commentators described the design as common-sense and not sensational with evident attention to detail. The blue saloon with shining black roof and mouldings drew attention.

Fifteen .9

Engine

The 2.8 Litre four cylinders in line engine made in a single casting had a detachable cylinder head and was fitted with, new for Humber, overhead inlet, side-by-side exhaust valves. Their equivalent prewar car with an engine of 3.3 Litres had twin overhead camshafts.

Bodies

The 15.9 was available as a saloon or a 5-seater tourer. There was no door for the driver because the brake lever and gear change lever were to his right and the spare wheel and tyre were fastened to the outside of the car at the same point. 

A saloon landaulette was added to the standard range and it also showed the care and forethought put in to give comfort and convenience. Between front and back seats it had a glass partition with sliding panels and there was an extra fold-away seat in the rear compartment which might be turned to face either side.

Brakes suspension steering

The hand lever to the driver's right by the change-speed lever operated internal expanding brakes on the back wheels, the foot brake pedal operated a contracting band on a drum just behind the gearbox. A hand adjustment for wear was provided for both rear and transmission brakes. The Times thought the suspension was not quite free from fore and aft movement but was otherwise satisfactory and comfortable on a rough road. The springs were set with a minimum of camber, they were half-elliptical, set on top of the axles and from 1923 Hartford shock absorbers were fitted at the back.  Steering was by worm and complete wheel and could be adjusted for wear

Test

A road test  of Humber's Fifteen horsepower five-seater open tourer by the motoring correspondent of The Times resulted in published comments along the following lines. The Fifteen is an expensive car but, without an employee for the purpose, an owner who drives it himself is expected to care for its every need, daily.

The owner-driver's needs seem to have been considered very carefully and all but one of them met, that is the difficulty in draining engine oil which requires the removal of an undershield. A minor point was that the rear tappet  plate was  made difficult to remove by having carburettor control springs anchored on it. The newspaper noted that a few drops of oil two or three times a week ensures tappets run for a long time without shake otherwise they soon become noisy.

The following good points were noted by The Times:
easy  to reach magneto, dynamo, starter and carburettor
clutch spigot and the withdrawal mechanism automatically lubricated
all brakes have easy to reach hand adjustments
no grease-cups but spring-controlled ball-valve greasers throughout the chassis, special gun supplied
easy to reach tools, access does not disturb a passenger
fuel tank at the back has a gauge easy to read when the luggage grid is fully loaded
fuel tank fuel filter funnel
all-weather hood; the side-curtain beside the driver has access for a signalling arm
Accordingly, The Times also noted that "it is not necessary to lift floorboards and poke about with an oilcan before a journey".

The car was thought to be moderately fast, best run  but it seemed to have a minor fault and should have reached . Seating was assessed to be comfortable with unusually generous knee room in the front seat. Of 5-seater owner-driver cars that have been submitted to The Times for trial this car, said the reviewer, is the best. He did consider the car a little narrow for five passengers but decided there is sufficient legroom

On the road, he reported, the lively quiet and flexible engine was silky on top and accelerated with real spirit. Though the clutch could grab, the gears were easy and quiet. The car's steering was delightful but its brakes and suspension were only satisfactory.

Fifteen 40

The 15-40-hp, a lightly revised 15.9, was displayed at the Olympia Motor Show in October 1924.

Engine
The Times noted some trouble had been taken to dampen engine vibration. The engine and separate gearbox were on a subframe. The engine was flexibly held by two sets of enclosed springs at the front end and at the back by semi-circular steel trunnion blocks. These blocks were secured by spring-loaded bolts. This way the engine was held firmly in a fore and aft position but could swing to the limits of the two sets of enclosed front springs.

Bodies
Each body now had four instead of three doors. The rear seats were wider incorporating the space above the wheel arches, the mudguards were built closer to the wheels to reduce mud splashing. The saloon landaulette's solo occasional seat was now a pair and they folded into the partition below the glass division.

Brakes, suspension
The 15-40-hp was fitted with Humber-Perrott semi-servo front wheel brakes. The driver's foot pedal still worked the transmission brake and now the front wheel brakes as well. A floating shoe gave the semi-servo effect and it relied to some extent on forward motion. Applying the brakes when backing the car received only half the force. Front axle and stub axles were strengthened to accommodate the higher loads from braking, to the same end the springs were wider and there was a new cross tube linking the dumb irons (forward ends of the main longitudinal chassis members). Front brake adjustment was carried out by jacking up that end of the car and the hand-operated nuts turned until equal pressure was provided to each wheel. The following year a compensating device was installed between the two sets of brakes.

Shock absorbers were now fitted to the front as well as to the back suspension.

Test
When the 15/40 was tested by The Times in August 1924 the report ended "travelling was a pleasure".

References

External links

Fifteen
Cars introduced in 1919